Black Thursday is a term used to refer to typically negative, notable events that have occurred on a Thursday. It has been used in the following cases:

21 June 1877 execution of 10 suspected leaders of the "Molly Maguires"
8 November 1901 (21 November in the Gregorian calendar), the climax of the gospel riots in Athens.
24 October 1929, start of the Wall Street Crash of 1929. 
14 October 1943, when the USAAF suffered large losses during bombing in the second Schweinfurt raid during World War II
21 November 1968, day of protests by students at University of Wisconsin-Oshkosh
12 April 1973, clashes between the police and right-wing demonstrators in Milan resulted in the killing of policeman Antonio Marino.
30 May 1975, the massacre of about 50 Lebanese Christians in the area of Bashoura in West Beirut.
24 July 2003, Jueves negro (Spanish for "Black Thursday"), when violent political demonstrations created havoc in Guatemala City
30 September 2009, when the Irish government revealed to its people the alleged full cost of bailing out Anglo-Irish Bank
15 November 2018, the Franco-Ontarian jeudi noir when the government of Ontario announced the elimination of several Franco-Ontarian institutions 
12 March 2020, Black Thursday stock market crash
"Black Thursday", the week day preceding Black Friday

See also
 Bloody Thursday (disambiguation)

References 

Thursday
Black days